The 2010 Thomas & Uber Cups Preliminaries for Africa were held in Kampala, Uganda, between 20 and 23 February and  organised by Uganda Badminton Association. Nigeria and South Africa was the defending champion in men's and women's team events. This tournament serves as qualification stage for African countries for the 2010 Thomas & Uber Cup.

Medalists

Men's Team

Women's Team

References

External links 
 Tournamentsoftware.com

Africa Continental Team Badminton Championships
Badminton tournaments in Uganda
2010 in badminton
February 2010 sports events in Africa